Samuel Bagín (born 8 February 2004) is a Slovak professional footballer who plays as a centre-back for Fortuna Liga club AS Trenčín.

Club career

AS Trenčín
Bagín made his Fortuna Liga debut for AS Trenčín in an away fixture against Dukla Banská Bystrica on 10 February 2023.

References

External links
 AS Trenčín official club profile 
 Futbalnet profile 
 
 

2004 births
Living people
People from Ilava
Sportspeople from the Trenčín Region
Slovak footballers

Association football defenders
AS Trenčín players
Slovak Super Liga players